Goães is a parish in Amares Municipality in the Braga District in Portugal. The population in 2011 was 557, in an area of 3.03 km².

References

Freguesias of Amares